

Biography
Giorgio's son, Raffaele Angelo Soleri was also a painter. The source indicates only two authenticated works of Soleri: a Virgin who places the city of Alessandria under her protection and St Lawrence genuflects to the Madonna from a church in Casale.

Notes

1537 deaths
People from the Province of Alessandria
Italian male painters
16th-century Italian painters
Painters from Milan